Central Kildare is a settlement in Prince Edward Island. It is located a few kilometres north of Alberton, Prince Edward Island.

Communities in Prince County, Prince Edward Island